Illinois Route 72 is an east–west state road in northern Illinois. It runs from the intersection with Illinois Route 73 north of Lanark east to Illinois Route 43 (Harlem Avenue) in Chicago.

Route description 

Illinois 72 is called Higgins Road for most of its length in the Chicago area, and has been redirected in parts of the area to accommodate for new features. Near Rosemont, the road has been shifted to make way for O'Hare International Airport — further east, parts of the road have been moved to make room for the Northwest Tollway (Interstate 90). The road serves as a major six-lane thoroughfare for several western suburbs, including Schaumburg, Elk Grove Village, and Hoffman Estates.

The latter is a Wrong-way concurrency, where one can be driving both west on Illinois 72 and east on U.S. 20 at the same time. West from Chicago, Illinois 72 largely parallels Interstate 90 until Starks, crossing over and under the highway six times without an intersection. On a larger scale, it is the main east–west artery to Chicago between Interstate 90 and Illinois Route 64.

It serves the towns and cities of, from west to east, Lanark, Shannon, Forreston, Leaf River, Byron, Stillman Valley, Kirkland, Kingston, Genoa, Hampshire, Gilberts, Sleepy Hollow, West Dundee, East Dundee, South Barrington, Hoffman Estates, Schaumburg, Elk Grove Village, Des Plaines, Rosemont, and Chicago.  Higgins Road/Higgins Avenue continues east-southeast from Harlem Avenue in Chicago to Milwaukee Avenue near Lawrence Avenue.

Route 72 is one of seven state roads to enter the city of Chicago.  It was once part of the Galena-Chicago Stagecoach Trail.

History 
SBI Route 72 originally ran from Lanark to Starks. It was extended east in 1937 and 1938 to East Dundee, and then to Chicago. In 1968, the designation of IL 72 was truncated back to IL 43 (Harlem Avenue), lopping off . In 1982, it was shortened again, this time to Illinois Route 73.

The crash site of American Airlines Flight 191 is located along the road as Touhy Avenue, just north of the road and north of O'Hare International Airport near a trailer park.

Major intersections

See also
 Galena–Chicago trail

References

External links

 Illinois Highway Ends: Illinois Route 72

072
Transportation in Carroll County, Illinois
Transportation in Ogle County, Illinois
Transportation in DeKalb County, Illinois
Transportation in Kane County, Illinois
Transportation in Cook County, Illinois